The 2011–12 Dutch Basketball League (DBL) was the 52nd season of the highest Dutch professional basketball league. The regular season started on 8 October 2011. EiffelTowers Den Bosch won its 15th national championship, after beating ZZ Leiden 4–1 in the Finals. Seamus Boxley received the Most Valuable Player award this season.

Rules
This was the first season played with new rules about foreign players; all teams were allowed to have no more than four foreign players on their roster.

Foreign players 

Source: Eurobasket

Teams 

The league started with 8 teams in the 2011-12 season. WCAA Giants and ABC Amsterdam, quarterfinalist last year, didn't return because the clubs went bankrupt.

Regular season

Second stage

Group A

Group B

Playoffs 
The two group winners from the second stage advanced to the playoffs. The semifinals were played in a best-of-five format, while the finals were played in a best-of-seven format. Home advantage was decided by the regulars season seeds of the teams. The home team in each series alternated each game.

Awards

In European competitions

References

External links 
 Dutch Basketball League

Dutch Basketball League seasons
1
Netherlands